Roberto João Pereira Freire (20 April 1942) is a Brazilian lawyer and politician.

Freire was born in Recife. He is the president of Cidadania, former Federal Deputy, and former Minister of Culture appointed by president Michel Temer. He resigned from the office on 18 May 2017

Car Wash Scandal
Roberto Freire resigned as minister, due to his involvement with the crimes found in the Operation Car Wash.

The biggest implicated company, Odebrecht kept an entire department to coordinate the payment of bribe to politicians. In the Car Wash Operation, officers seized several electronic spreadsheets linking the payments to nicknames. Every corrupt politician received a nickname based on physical characteristics, public trajectory, personal infos, owned cars/boats, origin place or generic preferences. Roberto Freire's nickname was 'Curitiba', alusing the city with same name.

References

1942 births
Living people
Cidadania politicians
Brazilian Communist Party politicians
Members of the Chamber of Deputies (Brazil) from São Paulo
Ministers of Culture of Brazil
Candidates for Vice President of Brazil